Éléonore Duplay (1768, Paris – 26 July 1832, Paris), called Cornélie, after Cornelia Africana of Ancient Rome, was the daughter of Maurice Duplay, a master carpenter, and Françoise-Éléonore Vaugeois. She was the eldest of five children (four girls and a boy) and was born in 1768, two years after her parents' marriage, in Paris, where she would live all her life. During the Revolution, she studied painting under Jean-Baptiste Regnault.

According to her sister, Élisabeth, who married Philippe Le Bas of the Committee of General Security, she was "promised" to Maximilien Robespierre, whose political opinions she shared. He said of her, "âme virile, elle saurait mourir comme elle sait aimer" ("noble soul, she would know how to die as well as she knows how to love"). They often walked together in the Champs-Élysées or the woods of Versailles or Issy. Many contemporaries and historians have suggested that she may have been his mistress, including Vilate, a juror on the Revolutionary Tribunal, who said, that Robespierre "lived maritally with the eldest daughter of his hosts", in reference to Éléonore. After his death she wore black for the rest of her life, never marrying, and was known as la Veuve Robespierre (the Widow Robespierre).

Though guilty of no crime, she was imprisoned with her sister Élisabeth and her six-week-old nephew, Philippe Le Bas fils after 9 Thermidor. Élisabeth would later write in her memoir, "Oh! Je ne t'oublierai pas de ma vie! Car sans toi j'aurais succombé; mais par ton courage, tu as ranimé mes forces et tu m'a appris que j'avais une grande tâche à remplir que j'avais un fils, qu'il fallait vivre pour lui" and elsewhere, "non, bonne chère soeur Éléonore, je n'oublierai de ma vie tout ton dévouement pour moi et pour ton pauvre petit neveu; ma reconnaissance sera éternelle!" (Roughly translated: "Oh! I will not forget you in my lifetime! For without you I would have succumbed; but by your courage, you reanimated my force and taught me that I had a great task to fulfill in that I had a son and it was necessary to live for him" and "no, good, dear sister Éléonore, I will not forget in my lifetime all your devotion for me and for your poor little nephew; my gratitude will be eternal!") They would not be released until 18 Frimaire Year III.

Éléonore Duplay died on 26 July 1832, at the age of 64, and was buried in Père Lachaise Cemetery, where her grave may still be seen in the 34th division.

References

1768 births
1832 deaths
Burials at Père Lachaise Cemetery
People from Paris
People of the French Revolution